

Events
March 13 – Felix Mendelssohn's Violin Concerto is premièred in Leipzig with Ferdinand David as soloist.
April 21 –  Albert Lortzing's opera Undine debuts in Magdeburg.
June 4 – William Fry's opera Leonora debuts in Philadelphia.
July – Pas de Quatre is premièred in London, bringing together four of the greatest ballerinas of the time: Lucile Grahn, Carlotta Grisi, Fanny Cerrito, and Marie Taglioni.
July 19 – The National Anthem of Uruguay is first performed with music composed by Francisco José Debali with the collaboration of Fernando Quijano.
October 19 – Richard Wagner's opera Tannhäuser debuts at the Dresden Hoftheater.
Composer Henry Hugo Pierson goes to live in Germany.
The Hutchinson Family Singers tour England with Frederick Douglass.
Theodore Thomas arrives in the United States. The conductor would eventually become the Father of American Symphonic culture.
Austrian pianist Leopold von Meyer (1816–1883) begins a tour of the United States.
The saxhorn family of valved brass instruments is patented by Adolphe Sax in France.

Classical music
Francesco Florimo – La Tarantella
Louis Moreau Gottschalk – Bamboula: A Fantasy for solo piano.
Hans Christian Lumbye – Champagne Galop, Op. 14
Robert Schumann – Piano Concerto in A minor
Pedro Soler – Premier Air varié sur un thème original
Václav Veit – Les adieux, Op. 26
Giuseppe Verdi – Seste Romanze II 
Samuel Sebastian Wesley – Morning and Evening Service in E major

Opera
W. H. Fry – Leonora
Albert Lortzing – Undine
Giovanni Pacini – Stella di Napoli, premiered December 11 in Naples
Temistocle Solera – La Hermana de Palayo
Giuseppe Verdi 
Alzira
Giovanna d'Arco
Richard Wagner – Tannhäuser

Births
January 17 – Erika Nissen, pianist (died 1903)
February 25 – Eugène Goossens, père, conductor (d. 1906)
March 5 – Alphonse Hasselmans, harpist and composer (d. 1912)
March 7 – Edward Lloyd, concert tenor (d. 1927)
March 13 – Joséphine Daram, opera singer (died 1926)
March 14 – August Bungert, opera composer (d. 1915)
May 12 – Gabriel Fauré, composer (d. 1924)
May 22 – Francis Hueffer, music writer (died 1889)
June 13 – Effie Germon, actress and singer (d. 1914)
July 1 – Ika Peyron, composer (d. 1922)
July 6 – Ángela Peralta, operatic soprano (d. 1883)
August 10 – Abay Qunanbayuli, poet, composer and philosopher (d. 1904)
August 25 – King Ludwig II of Bavaria, the great patron of Richard Wagner
November 6 – Beniamino Cesi, pianist (d. 1907)
November 8 – Madeline Schiller, pianist (d. 1911)
date unknown 
Annie Jessy Curwen, writer of children's music books (died 1932)
Antonio Galassi, operatic baritone (d. 1904)

Deaths
March 29 – Victor Lhérie, librettist (born 1808)
May 11 – Carl Filtsch, pianist and composer (b. 1830)
July 10 – Juan Paris, composer and priest (born 1805)
July 15 – Joseph Augustine Wade, conductor and composer (b. 1796)
September 23 – Matija Ahacel, collector of folk songs (b. 1779)
October 7 – Isabella Colbran, soprano and first wife of Gioacchino Rossini (b. 1785)
October 16 – Martha Llwyd, hymn-writer (b. 1766)
October 26 – Carolina Oliphant Nairne, songwriter (born 1766)
November 2 – Chrétien Urhan, violinist and organist (b. 1790)
December 2 – Simon Mayr, composer (b. 1763)<ref>Heinrich Bauer: Simon Mayr 1763–1845, Meister der italienischen Oper aus der bayerischen Oberpfalz. (Munich : Bayer. Vereinsbank), 1983</ref>
December 25 – Wilhelm Friedrich Ernst Bach, composer (b. 1759)date unknown'' – Alexander Juhan, violinist, conductor and composer (b. 1765)

References

 
19th century in music
Music by year